Retreat or re-treat may refer to:

Common uses
Retreat (spiritual), a time taken to reflect or meditate
Retreat (survivalism), a place of refuge for survivalists

Military
Retreat (bugle call), a military signal for the end of day, known as "Sunset" in some countries
Retreat (military), a withdrawal of military forces

Places

Australia
 Retreat, Tasmania, a locality in Australia

Great Britain
Retreat, County Antrim, a small village in Northern Ireland
 The Retreat, the London home of English textile designer, artist, writer and socialist William Morris, who renamed it Kelmscott House

South Africa
Retreat, Cape Town

United States
Retreat, Indiana
Retreat, Louisiana
Retreat (Port Tobacco, Maryland)
Retreat, New Jersey
Retreat, Texas
Retreat, Wisconsin

Arts, entertainment, and media

Films
 Retreat (2011 film), a film starring Cillian Murphy, Jamie Bell, and Thandiwe Newton
 Retreat (2013 film), a short film featuring Sophie Stone
 The Retreat (2020 film), an American horror film
 The Retreat (2021 film), a Canadian slasher film

Literature
 The Retreat (Rambaud novel), a 2000 novel by Patrick Rambaud
 The Retreat (Bergen novel), a 2009 novel by David Bergen
 The Retreat: Hitler's First Defeat, 2009 book by Michael Jones

Music
 Retreat (2009), an album by the British post-rock band Vessels
 "Retreat" (2005 song), a song by The Rakes
 "Retreat (Cries My Heart)", a 1952 song by Nancy Farnsworth, Tommy Furtado, and Anita

Healthcare
Re-treat, to treat again, e.g., see Therapy
The Retreat,  a private mental hospital in York, England, founded in 1796